Maria Vittoria Margherita of Savoy (22 June 1740 – 14 July 1742) was the youngest daughter of King Charles Emmanuel III of Sardinia.

Biography 
Princess Maria Vittoria was born in Turin. She was the second child of Charles Emmanuel III of Sardinia and Élisabeth Thérèse of Lorraine. Her mother died in 1741 giving birth to her brother Prince Benedetto. Maria Vittoria died in Turin aged 2, and was buried at Royal Basilica of Superga, Turin.

Ancestry

References 

1740 births
1742 deaths
Nobility from Turin
Princesses of Savoy
Burials at the Basilica of Superga
Daughters of kings
Royalty and nobility who died as children